Göztepe Spor Kulübü (Göztepe Sports Club), also known as Göztepe, is a Turkish sports club based in the Göztepe and Güzelyalı neighborhoods of İzmir. The "AŞ" refers to incorporated company, as besides football, the club also has departments in fencing, triathlon, handball, volleyball, basketball, gymnastic, archery, billiards, sailing, swimming, and windsurfing.

Domestically, the greatest success was achieved when the club became Turkish champions in 1950. In 1969 Göztepe became the first Turkish football team to play a semi-final in European competitions.

Göztepe are one of the last examples of an authentic neighborhood club. They have one of the most devoted and die-hard fan bases in Turkey, despite their downfall between 2002–2008. Their games in the Regional Amateur League attracted more fans than most clubs in the Süper Lig.

History
The club was founded in 1925 as a breakaway from Altay. Their colours are red and yellow. They merged with İzmirspor and Egespor and were renamed as Doğanspor in 1937. Some supporters of İzmirspor opposed the merger and founded Ateşspor in 1938. Doğanspor was renamed again as Göztepe in 1939. Ateşspor was also renamed as İzmirspor the same year.

The club's greatest success was the win of the former Turkish Football Championship in 1950, where the football team won the Final Group in their own city, İzmir. With that, they became the first and only football club from İzmir to become Turkish football champions. Göz Göz also became runners-up in 1942.

Göztepe enjoyed a successful period between the years of 1963 and 1971 under the supervision of coach Adnan Süvari. Their common starting line-up during that period of success are still remembered today: Ali Artuner, Mehmet Işıkal, Çağlayan Derebaşı, Hüseyin Yazıcı, Mehmet Aydın, Nevzat Güzelırmak, Nihat Yayöz, Ertan Öznur, Fevzi Zemzem, Gürsel Aksel, Halil Kiraz.

Starting with 2002–03 season which brought relegation from Süper Lig, Göztepe struggled with financial problems. Due to the inability to reduce their outstanding debt, the football club was banned from signing new players, which resulted in a free-fall with the team being relegated four times in the next five seasons. On 21 April 2007 they lost their last home game 2–0 against Aliağa Belediyespor in TFF Third League and were relegated to the Regional Amateur League.

On 20 August 2007, the club was sold in an auction to an Istanbul-based business conglomerate Altınbaş Holdings. The owner, businessman İmam Altınbaş, vowed to take Göztepe back to the Süper Lig, making them one of the top five clubs in Turkish football. The owners of the club were met by the local fan base with initial suspicion. Altınbaş Holdings sold the club to Mehmet Sepil in June 2014, for a sum rumored to be around $9 million.

The team competed in the Regional Amateur League for the 2007–08 season but were eliminated by Ayazağaspor after a 6–5 penalty kick shootout in Eskişehir. However, on 18 June 2008 Aliağa Belediyespor merged with Göztepe, so that they took place of Aliağa Belediyespor in the TFF Third League. They played in TFF Third League Group 2 in 2008–09 season and finished 1st in group as qualified to Promotion Group. Göztepe secured promotion to TFF Second League after beating Lüleburgazspor 2–0 away from home with 3 weeks remaining before the end of the season. On 19 May 2009, Göztepe defeated Tepecik Belediyespor 2–0 at home and crowned as Third League champions.

After finishing TFF Second League as 8th placed in 2009–10, Göztepe won the TFF Second League White Group trophy and were promoted to TFF First League at the end of 2010–11 season. On 3 May 2015, Göztepe won the TFF Second League and were promoted to TFF First League. On 4 June 2017, Göztepe advanced to the Süper Lig for the first time since the 2002–03 season.

On 19 August 2022, Göztepe became the first Turkish football club to be majority owned by foreign investors with the London based sports investment firm, Sport Republic, purchasing a 70% stake in the club.

Rivalries

The main rivals of Göztepe are another İzmir club, Karşıyaka. When the two teams played on 16 May 1981 while chasing the TFF First League title, the game attracted a crowd of 80,000 Persons. The Guinness Book of World Records recognizes this milestone as a world record for a Second Division football game and The Guardian published an article named "The biggest non-top-flight attendance ever" including this match. It is one of the most fiercely contested derbies in the world. They also have a rivalry with the other large clubs in İzmir, Altay, Altınordu, İzmirspor and also Bucaspor.

Stadium

Starting from 1 October 2016, Göztepe ground-shared with Altınordu F.K. and used the Bornova Stadium until their new and very own stadium was built. On 26 January 2020, Göztepe played the first game of their own Gürsel Aksel Stadium against Beşiktaş and they are still using this stadium as their home ground.

Stadium history

Honours

League
 Turkish Football Championship
 Champions: 1950
 Runners-up: 1942
 TFF First League
 Winners: 1977–78, 1980–81, 1998–99, 2000–01
 Runners-up: 1989–90, 1990–91
 TFF Second League
 Winners: 2010–11, 2014–15
 Runners-up: 2013–14
 TFF Third League
 Winners: 2008–09

Cups
Turkish Cup
Winners: 1968–69, 1969–70
Runners-up: 1966–67
Turkish Super Cup
Winners: 1970
Runners-up: 1969
Prime Minister's Cup
Runners-up: 1950

Europe
Inter-Cities Fairs Cup
Semi-finalist: 1968–69
UEFA Cup Winners' Cup
Quarter-finalist: 1969–70

Other achievements
Turkish Federation Cup
Winners: 1962–63
İzmir Football League
Winners (5): 1941–42, 1942–43, 1943–44, 1949–50, 1952–53

Statistics

Leagues affiliation
 Süper Lig: 1959–77, 1978–80, 1981–82, 1999–2000, 2001–03, 2017–2022
 TFF First League: 1977–78, 1980–81, 1982–99, 2000–01, 2003–04, 2011–13, 2015–2017, 2022–
 TFF Second League: 2004–05, 2009–11, 2013–15
 TFF Third League: 2005–07, 2008–09
 Amateur Level: 2007–08

League results (since 1959)

Continental competitions

Summary

Achievements

Results at UEFA Competitions

UEFA Cup Winners' Cup

Inter-Cities Fairs Cup

Players

Current squad

Other players under contract

Out on loan

Current staff

Board members

Technical staff

Managerial history

Presidential history

References

External links

Official website
Göztepe on TFF.org

 
Football clubs in Turkey
Association football clubs established in 1925
1925 establishments in Turkey
Süper Lig clubs
Sports teams in İzmir